The 1918 Argentine Primera División was the 27th season of top-flight football in Argentina. The season began on April 7 and ended on November 17.

Racing won its 6th. consecutive league title, remaining unbeaten at the end of the season. Defensores de Belgrano debuted in Primera after promoting last year, while Argentino (Q) and Ferro Carril Oeste (which was also expelled from the Association) were relegated.

Final table

References

Argentine Primera División seasons
1918 in Argentine football
1918 in South American football